Lactococcus fujiensis  is a Gram-positive and facultatively anaerobic bacterium from the genus Lactococcus which has been isolated from the leaves of Chinese cabbage from Fujinomiya in Japan.

References

 

Streptococcaceae
Bacteria described in 2011